Bure is a commune in the Meuse department in Grand Est in northeastern France.

It hosts the Meuse/Haute Marne Underground Research Laboratory for radioactive waste storage. Its population as of 2009 is 94.

Population

See also
Communes of the Meuse department

References

Communes of Meuse (department)